is a Japanese football player. He is currently playing for Cambodia Tiger in Cambodian League.

Career
A tall but technical striker, he has played for Japan at U-15 level before being called into the Avispa Fukuoka first team at age 18. Has experienced European football during a short study period at FC Girondins de Bordeaux, he is considered good with his feet for someone his size.

Club statistics

References

External links

1991 births
Living people
Association football people from Fukuoka Prefecture
Japanese footballers
J1 League players
J2 League players
Avispa Fukuoka players
Alemannia Aachen players
Expatriate footballers in Cambodia
Association football forwards
Angkor Tiger FC players
Japanese expatriate sportspeople in Cambodia